Dianbai District, alternately romanized as Tinpak, is an urban district of the prefecture-level city of Maoming in southwestern Guangdong Province, China.

History
Dianbei Commandery was established in AD528 under the Liang dynasty. It and the subsequent Dianbei County were organized under Gaozhou Commandery. Under the Qing, Dianbai was one of the major ports of Guangdong. After the Chinese Civil War, it was placed under Maoming and eventually promoted to an urban district. Dianbai absorbed Maoming's former Maogang District on 23 February 2014.

Climate

Notes

References

Further reading
 

County-level divisions of Guangdong
Maoming